Kohin, also known as (Bahasa) Seruyan, is a Barito language of the central Kalimantan, Indonesia.

References 

West Barito languages
Endangered Austronesian languages
Languages of Indonesia